Pura Lingsar was built by Anak Agung Ngurah in 1714, located 15 km from Mataram. Lingsar origin from sasak language mean clear revelation from God, the area has a spring, which scared by Sasak people, who belief Wetu Telu (syncretic Islam and Sasak origin belief).

Building
Some parts of the Lingsar Park complex have been taken over which used to have an area of 40,000 m², leaving only half of it, in the complex there are 2 religious buildings of Pura and Kemaliq, of which there are 3 large ponds and a public bath.

Festival
The festival at Pura Lingsar is held every 6th full moon or purnamaning sasih kenem on Balinese saka calendar dan 7th full moon or sasih kepitu on Sasak calendar. When festival there will held ritual Perang Topat and attraction of Batek Baris accccompanied by gendang beleq

Batek Baris

When the festival was held, the first procession was called mendak pesaji, which was an accompaniment of offerings marching into area of the pura, in front of the offerings there were dancers Batek Baris, who dressed in the Dutch East Indies army, the dancers spoke Dutch but using sasak accent, where the dancer is accompanied by music Gendang beleq

Topat War
Topat war is a war attraction carried out by Hindus and Muslims people, where the war uses ketupat as its weapon. This war was carried out after the two residents made a prayer, both lined up facing each other to throw ketupat. At the end of the war the both residents will collect scattered ketupat to be buried in the rice fields, they believe that if do that it will fertilize their land.

References 

Lingsar